Springdale Cemetery is a historic, non-sectarian, active cemetery in the United States city of Peoria, Illinois.  It was chartered in 1855, received its first interment in 1857. Almost 78,000 individuals are buried at the cemetery.  It contains a public mausoleum and 15 private mausoleums.

The property was acquired in 1854, and the first interment took place in April 1857. The Cemetery is an active, non-sectarian burial ground, and the property contains 15 private mausoleums.  The historic gatehouse, constructed in 1901, was razed in 2010.  The public mausoleum, which was designed by the Chicago architectural firm of Lovell & Lovell, was completed in 1929 and has been expanded twice. The cemetery once grew to over  but has since retracted to its present size of 223 acres.  The property includes six and a half miles of winding driveways.  The cemetery is the final resting place for nearly 78,000 individuals from the Peoria area.  The property is not fully developed, and as a result, the Cemetery can accommodate another 50,000 burials.  The Cemetery permits traditional burial in the ground, entombment in the mausoleum, inurnment of cremated remains in crypts and in burial lots, and a scattering garden.  The Cemetery is actively planning for green burial.

History
Interment in the cemetery began in April 1857 after the Illinois State Legislature granted the managers the authority to accept pre-payment for interment services and trust funds for perpetual care.  The cemetery remained in private ownership until 1999 at which time Illinois Comptroller Dan Hynes seized control the property due to improper management and neglected maintenance.  A receiver was appointed to act on behalf of the Comptroller, and in September 2002, the publicly appointed Springdale Cemetery Management Authority was established to manage the Cemetery following the signing of an intergovernmental agreement between the City of Peoria (the property owner), the County of Peoria, the Peoria Park District, and the Springdale Historic Preservation Foundation, a 501(c)3 organization.

Individuals interred in the Cemetery include Octave Chanute, the father of American aviation; Lucie (Brotherson) Tyng, founder of the Women's Christian Temperance Union; Lydia (Moss) Bradley, founder of Bradley Polytechnic Institute (now Bradley University); former Illinois Governor Thomas Ford (1842–1846); American artist Hedley Waycott; Anastase Robin, a member of Napoleon's Imperial Guard; and others who are prominent in the establishment of Peoria as well as common men and women who made the city their home.  Approximately 900 military veterans lie buried on the grounds (including Frank Wilbur "Spig" Wead, a U.S. Navy aviator who helped promote United States Naval aviation from its inception) in both a designated Soldiers' Hill (established in 1862) as well as in private lots.

Springdale Cemetery was listed on the National Register of Historic Places as a historic district December 10, 2004. The district contains 53 properties, just three of which are classified as non-contributing members to the historic district. The contributing properties within the district include 3 buildings, one site, 17 structures and 29 objects.

References

External links
 
 Illinois Ancestors – Springdale Cemetery Headstone Photos
 

1855 establishments in Illinois
Cemeteries in Illinois
Peoria, Illinois
National Register of Historic Places in Peoria County, Illinois
Cemeteries on the National Register of Historic Places in Illinois
Protected areas of Peoria County, Illinois